The Șumuleul Mare (also: Șomleul Mare;) is a small river in the Gurghiu Mountains, Harghita County, central Romania. It is a left tributary of the river Mureș. It flows through the municipality Ciumani, and joins the Mureș near the village Ciumani.

References

Rivers of Romania
Rivers of Harghita County